The Way I Feel is the only studio album by Canadian R&B musician Remy Shand. Three singles were released from the album: "Take a Message", "The Way I Feel", and "Rocksteady". "Take a Message" was the only song from the album to chart on the Billboard Hot 100, peaking at #89. Shand wrote and produced all of the album's tracks.

The album peaked at #1 on the Canadian Albums Chart and at #39 on the Billboard 200. In 2003, the album was nominated for a Grammy for Best R&B Album. "Take a Message" was nominated for Grammys for both Best Male R&B Vocal Performance and Best R&B Song, while "Rocksteady" was nominated for a Grammy for Best Traditional R&B Vocal Performance.

Track listing

Charts

Weekly charts

Year-end charts

Certifications

References

External links
 
 

2001 debut albums
2002 debut albums
Motown albums
Remy Shand albums
Universal Records albums
Juno Award for R&B/Soul Recording of the Year recordings